Report on the Lands of the Arid Region of the United States is a scientific report and policy recommendation written by American explorer, geologist, and anthropologist John Wesley Powell, and first published in 1878. The work sought to create an equitable and sustainable method for developing the arid region of the United States, an area characterized by its low annual rain that encompasses 40% of the continental portion of the country.

The work begins with a detailed account of the climate of the western United States, founded on Smithsonian climate data and Powell's personal observations from his own extensive surveys of the region. Powell describes the extent and potential of three main types of land in the region: irrigable lands, timber lands, and pasturage lands. After his initial establishment of the details of the arid region's climatic conditions, he questions several of the period's prevailing ideas of the West and crafts several policy proposals to be considered by Congress.

Policy critiques and proposals 
In the report, Powell sites empirical evidence of rain patterns that contradict the theory that Rain follows the plow, which was widely propagated by politicians, scientists, railroad corporations, and proponents of Manifest destiny. Powell also argued against many common practices and laws used to settle unclaimed lands in the Public Domain managed by the General Land Office. Powell discouraged the practice of dividing government land into arbitrary rectangular plots for settlement, arguing that this technique ran the risk of concentrating valuable water resources on single plots, leaving adjacent plots unable to be settled, farmed or used for pasturage. He also pointed out the inadequacies of the Homestead Act of 1860 for settling the arid lands. The Act allowed individuals over the age of 21 to stake a claim for parcel of land of 160 acres. Powell argued that while this was fitting for the humid and sub-humid regions of the country, 160 acres of dry, western land would be too little to support grazing due to sparse vegetation and also too little for agriculture without irrigation due to scarce water availability.

As one of the central tenets of his strategy for developing the western United States, Powell proposed that settlements consist of cooperative communities, similar to those of the Mormons, Pueblos, and Hispanic New Mexicans. This communal lifestyle would allow groups to pool the capital for the irrigation projects necessary to draw water from large rivers. This idea stemmed from the notion that smaller streams can often be diverted by individuals but irrigation projects from larger rivers require more work and capital than individual citizens can provide

He proposed that collectives of 9 or more individuals be able to create their own irrigation or grazing districts with a maximum number of acres per person. The lands would be surveyed and classified primarily by the United States Geological Survey as irrigable lands, timber lands, pasturage lands, mineral lands, and coal lands. These would have different regulations for communal settlement. Individuals and groups would then democratically determine their own allotments and hold other individuals accountable to prevent fraud

Political borders would be organized based on watershed boundaries, guaranteeing access to irrigation for a maximum number of individuals instead of allowing scarce water resources to be controlled by single allotments. In order to further ensure a democratic division of water, Powell was insistent in the report that water rights not be separated from land they irrigated on the basis that this would prevent developers from monopolizing water rights and extorting landowners.

Following events 
The publication of Report on the Lands of the Arid Regions of the United States further established Powell's reputation as an authority on the western United States, its physical characteristics, and the problems it faced. On March 3, 1879, the same day that a second round of reprinting of the report was ordered, Powell's survey of the west was merged with two other competing expeditions to create the United States Geological Survey with Powell's peer and friend Clarence King as its first director. Powell was put in charge of the newly created Bureau of American Ethnology. In 1881, upon King's resignation, Powell was also appointed the second director of the Geological Survey. In these positions, Powell led efforts to catalog the disappearing cultures of Native Americans and further study the geographic character of the West. Under Powell, from 1881 to 1884, the Geological Survey became the largest scientific organization of its type in the world.

In this time, Powell also continued to push his ideas on the orderly development and irrigation of western arid lands. In 1886, harsh blizzards killed livestock and subsequent of droughts devastated homesteaded farmers. In response, Congress appropriated funds in 1888 for the Geological Survey under Powell to undertake a survey of irrigable lands and identify possible areas for dams and irrigation projects, allowing one of Powell's main ideas the opportunity to become reality. With the same legislation, Congress also gave the Secretary of the Interior the ability to withdraw lands from the public domain, stating:... all the lands made susceptible of irrigation by such reservoirs, ditches or canals are from this time henceforth hereby reserved from sale as the property of the United States, and shall not be subject after the passage of this act, to entry, settlement or occupation until further provided by law ..."

The survey identified possible sites for reservoirs in Utah, Texas, and California through the summer of 1889. However, the survey's effectivity was compromised by speculators that followed the expedition and subsequently claimed land that it identified as irrigable, knowing that the land would be made more valuable by the planned irrigation projects. After the surveying and consequent speculation of the land around Bear Lake in Utah, the Secretary of the Interior responded by withdrawing all lands from the public domain until the survey could be concluded. This action caused immediate backlash from Congress, speculators, and normal citizens. The following year, the portion of the legislation that allowed the withdrawals from public domain was repealed. The Irrigation Survey was slashed, and in the following year of 1890, the overall US Geological Survey budget was slashed as well. With the financial troubles caused by the Panic of 1893, the Survey's chances of budgetary recovery were dashed. In 1894, Powell resigned as Director of the US Geological Survey to focus on his anthropological work at the Bureau of American Ethnology and his declining health.

Opposition 
From the publication of the Report on the Lands of the Arid Region of the United States until the end of his term at the US Geological Survey, Powell's ideas had not gathered enough support to be codified into law. Powell received intense criticism for a multitude of reasons. Many individuals took issue with the report's recommendation that grazing allotments from the public domain be 2,560 acres. Powell saw this size as necessary for cattle to have enough pasturage to survive the arid conditions, others saw it as supporting wealthier ranchers and powerful investors instead of the average American.

Powell was also opposed for his support of large-scale federal programs which were perceived as threatening private enterprise and the individual freedoms of western settlers. Western legislators, led by Senator William M. Stewart of Nevada originally championed the creation and funding of Powell's Irrigation Survey. However, Stewart soon clashed with Powell's direction of the program due to differing notions of the involvement of the federal government. Stewart imagined the expedition identifying potential sites for irrigation and then turning them over to private interests to develop. Powell, on the other hand, intended to create irrigation districts based on watersheds, invested in and governed by local communities, and overseen by the federal government. With the Secretary of the Interior's controversial withdrawal of all land from the public domain, Powell lost even more favor from the American public and gained further ire from vested commercial interests, making his plans for the scientifically managed development of the West politically impossible. As a result, Powell's ideas went generally disregarded with the Homestead Act, large-scale damming projects by the United States Bureau of Reclamation, and water rights untethered to the land being norms throughout the West in the years following [3][2].

References 

Environmental policy in the United States
Western United States